Grinyov is a rural locality (a khutor) in Kalach, Kalacheyevsky District, Voronezh Oblast, Russia. The population was 79 as of 2010. There are four streets.

Geography 
Grinyov is located 13 km northwest of Kalach (the district's administrative centre) by road. Garankin is the nearest rural locality.

References 

Rural localities in Kalacheyevsky District